The European Heart Rhythm Association score of atrial fibrillation (or EHRA score) is a classification system for the extent of atrial fibrillation. It places patients in one of four categories based on how much they are limited during physical activity; the limitations/symptoms are in regard to normal breathing and varying degrees in shortness of breath and/or angina.

The classification system is named after the European Heart Rhythm Association.

See also
 Canadian Cardiovascular Society grading of angina pectoris
 CHA2DS2–VASc score
 HAS-BLED
 Management of atrial fibrillation
 New York Heart Association Functional Classification

References 

Diagnostic cardiology